Moi et Cie (Me and Co., stylized as MOI ET CE and previously stylized as MOI&cie) is a Canadian French language specialty channel owned by Groupe TVA. The channel primarily broadcasts entertainment and lifestyle programming aimed at women.

History

The channel launched on May 2, 2011 in both standard and high definition as 'Mlle' ('Mademoiselle,' or ('Miss').

On September 12, 2011, Mlle was launched on Shaw Direct; it is now available across the country.

On February 1, 2013, Mlle was re-branded as MOI&cie, as an extension of Quebecor's magazine of the same name.

References

External links
  

Digital cable television networks in Canada
French-language television networks in Canada
Television channels and stations established in 2011
Women's interest channels
2011 establishments in Canada